Tai Sang Bank Limited is a licensed privately-owned bank based in Hong Kong. The bank was established by Ma Kam-chan, a businessman from Kwangtung (now Guangdong), in 1937 after his family migrated to Hong Kong. Ma went on to serve as the Chairman of the bank until he died in 1984. The bank is currently chaired by Patrick Ma Ching Hang. Tai Sang Bank is a member of the Hong Kong Association of Banks.

Senior leadership 
The bank is led by the Chairman, and it has traditionally been a member of the majority-owner Ma family.

List of chairmen 

 Ma Kam-chan (1937–1984)
 Ma Kam-ming (1984–2003)
 William Ma Ching-wai (2003–2019)
 Patrick Ma Ching-hang (since July 2019)

Network
Tai Sang operates out of a single branch on Des Veoux Road Central (德輔道中) and does not offer any online banking or ATM services. The bank largely relies on small-scale transactions and a high degree of customer service, providing more flexible solutions than larger lenders. The bank's main clients are brokers and gold traders.

US sanctions
As the United States imposed sanctions on a number of Mainland and Hong Kong officials (under the Hong Kong Human Rights and Democracy Act and the Hong Kong Autonomy Act) in the wake of the 2019 protests and the imposition of the National Security Law many multinational banks were no longer able to offer their services to those named in the sanction lists. This has increased the appeal of banks, such as Tai Sang, which do not operate outside the territory and therefore are less vulnerable to legal action for violating the sanctions.

References

Banks established in 1937
Banks of Hong Kong
1937 establishments in Hong Kong